Calliostoma jujubinum, common name the jujube top shell, is a species of sea snail, a marine gastropod mollusk in the family Calliostomatidae.

Description
The size of the shell varies between 13 mm and 34 mm.
The solid, heavy shell has a pyramidal-conic shape. It has a narrowly perforate funnel-shaped umbilicus. Its color is chestnut-brown, purple-brown on the upper whorls. It is marked with narrow, curved, rather widely separated longitudinal white streaks. The base of the shell is minutely dotted with white. The sculpture consists of numerous little-elevated spiral beaded lirulae, with many spiral striae between them. The base is flat and has coarser concentric subgranulose lirae, becoming finer toward the outer margin. The spire elevated. There are about 10 whorls, concave above, swollen and projecting at the periphery, the last obtusely angled. The oblique aperture is quadrate. The outer lip is beveled, strongly 5 or 6 lirate within. The basal lip is straight, very thick, obtuse, crenulate, lirate inside. The columella is arcuate, ending below in a point or tooth. The umbilicus is white within. The young specimens have a minute smooth, rounded, rather elevated dextral nucleus, and
bicingulate periphery.

Distribution
This species occurs in the Gulf of Mexico, the Caribbean Sea and off the Lesser Antilles; in the Atlantic Ocean from North Carolina to Southern Brazil at depths between 0 m and 192 m.

References

 Röding, P. F. 1798. Museum Boltenianum.  viii + 199 pp. Hamburg.
 Philippi, R. A. 1843. Trochus. Abbildungen und Beschreibungen neuer oder wenig gekannter Conchylien 1(2–3): 31–34, 65–69, pl. 1–2.
 Dall, W. H. 1889. Reports on the results of dredgings, under the supervision of Alexander Agassiz, in the Gulf of Mexico (1877–78) and in the Caribbean Sea (1879–80), by the U. S. Coast Survey Steamer 'Blake,'. Bulletin of the Museum of Comparative Zoology 18: 1–492, pls. 10–40. 
 Olsson, A. A. and A. Harbison. 1953. Pliocene Mollusca of Southern Florida, with special reference to those from North Saint Petersburg. Monographs of the Academy of Natural Sciences of Philadelphia 8: vii + 459, 65 pls.
 Rosenberg, G., F. Moretzsohn, and E. F. García. 2009. Gastropoda (Mollusca) of the Gulf of Mexico, Pp. 579–699 in Felder, D.L. and D.K. Camp (eds.), Gulf of Mexico–Origins, Waters, and Biota. Biodiversity. Texas A&M Press, College Station, Texas.

External links
 

jujubinum
Gastropods described in 1791
Taxa named by Johann Friedrich Gmelin